The 106th Wisconsin Legislature is the current ongoing legislative session in Wisconsin.  It was convened on January 10, 2023, in regular session, and will likely adjourn in the Spring of 2024.

This is the first legislative session after the redistricting of the Senate and Assembly according to a decision of the Wisconsin Supreme Court in 2022.

Senators representing odd-numbered districts are newly elected for this session and are serving the first two years of a four-year term.  Assembly members are elected to a two-year term.  Assembly members and odd-numbered senators were elected in the general election of November 8, 2022. Senators representing even-numbered districts are serving the third and fourth year of their four-year term, having been elected in the general election held on November 3, 2020.

Major events
 January 3, 2023: For the first time since the 68th Congress, the United States House of Representatives failed to elect a speaker on the first day of the 118th Congress.
 February 8, 2023: On his first trip after the 2023 State of the Union Address, U.S. President Joe Biden visited Dane County, Wisconsin, and spoke to workers at a LiUNA training center in DeForest, Wisconsin.
 February 12, 2023: Following the 2023 Chinese balloon incident, another suspected Chinese balloon was detected near northern Wisconsin and was shot down over Lake Huron.
 March 17, 2023: Wisconsin's longest-serving statewide elected officer, secretary of state Doug La Follette, retired after more than 40 years in office.
 April 4, 2023: 2023 Spring general election
 November 5, 2024: 2024 United States general election

Major legislation
 January 19, 2023: Joint Resolution to amend section 8 (2) of article I of the constitution; relating to: conditions for release prior to conviction, including the imposition of bail (second consideration), 2023 Senate Joint Resolution 2.  Second legislative passage of a proposed amendment to the Constitution of Wisconsin.

Party summary

Senate summary

Assembly summary

Sessions 
 Regular session: January 10, 2023Spring 2024

Leaders

Senate leadership 
 President: Chris Kapenga (R–Delafield)
 President pro tempore: Patrick Testin (R–Stevens Point)

Majority leadership 
 Majority Leader: Devin LeMahieu (R–Oostburg)
 Assistant Majority Leader: Dan Feyen (R–Fond du Lac)
 Majority Caucus Chair: Van H. Wanggaard (R–Racine)
 Majority Caucus Vice Chair: Joan Ballweg (R–Markesan)

Minority leadership 
 Minority Leader: Melissa Agard (D–Madison)
 Assistant Minority Leader: Jeff Smith (D–Brunswick)
 Minority Caucus Chair: Chris Larson (D–Milwaukee)
 Minority Caucus Vice Chair: Dianne Hesselbein (D–Middleton)

Assembly leadership 
 Speaker: Robin Vos (R–Rochester)
 Speaker pro tempore: Kevin David Petersen (R–Waupaca)

Majority leadership 
 Majority Leader: Tyler August (R–Lake Geneva)
 Assistant Majority Leader: Jon Plumer (R–Lodi)
 Majority Caucus Chair: Rob Summerfield (R–Bloomer)
 Majority Caucus Vice Chair: Cindi Duchow (R–Delafield)

Minority leadership 
 Minority Leader: Greta Neubauer (D–Racine)
 Assistant Minority Leader: Kalan Haywood (D–Milwaukee)
 Minority Caucus Chair: Lisa Subeck (D–Madison)
 Minority Caucus Vice Chair: Jill Billings (D–La Crosse)

Members

Members of the Senate 
Members of the Senate for the 106th Wisconsin Legislature:

Members of the Assembly 
Members of the Assembly for the 106th Wisconsin Legislature:

Employees

Senate employees 
 Chief Clerk: Michael Queensland
 Sergeant at Arms:

Assembly employees 
 Chief Clerk: Ted Blazel
 Sergeant at Arms: Anne Tonnon Byers

See also 
 2020 Wisconsin elections
 2020 Wisconsin State Senate election
 2020 Wisconsin State Assembly election
 2022 Wisconsin elections
 2022 Wisconsin State Senate election
 2022 Wisconsin State Assembly election

Notes

References

External links 
 2023: Related Documents from Wisconsin Legislature
 Wisconsin State Senate
 Wisconsin State Assembly

2023 establishments in Wisconsin
Wisconsin
Wisconsin
Wisconsin legislative sessions